Cape Cod Community College, known locally as "Four Cs", is a public community college in West Barnstable, Massachusetts. It was established in 1961, the second institution to open as part of what is now a 15 community college system in Massachusetts. Cape Cod Community College is the only community college and one of two colleges (along with Massachusetts Maritime Academy (Mass Maritime) in Buzzards Bay, Massachusetts (a Census-Designated Place in Bourne, Massachusetts)) on Cape Cod. It awards Associate in Arts and Associate in Science degrees and various academic certificates in a wide variety of programs. The college offers access to on-campus bachelor's and master's degree programs in partnership with: Bridgewater State University, Boston University, Lesley University, Salem State University, Suffolk University, UMass Boston, and UMass Dartmouth. Cape Cod Community College formally had a partnership with Wheelock College before that merged with Boston University to become the Boston University Wheelock College of Education & Human Development on Boston University's Fenway Campus. Cape Cod Community College is accredited by the New England Commission of Higher Education.

The college is home to the Lyndon P. Lorusso Applied Technology Building, a Leadership in Energy and Environmental Design certified facility completed in 2006.

Notable alumni
 Dana Mohler-Faria, President, Bridgewater State College

References

External links
 

 
1961 establishments in Massachusetts
Community colleges in Massachusetts
Educational institutions established in 1961
Universities and colleges in Barnstable County, Massachusetts